John F. Showalter is an American television director and editor.

He is well known for his work on Without a Trace, The Mentalist and Supernatural.

Career
Showalter's directing credits include Ghost Whisperer, House, Criminal Minds, Without a Trace, Supernatural, The Mentalist, Supergirl, and The Flash, as well as editing episodes of Lois & Clark: The New Adventures of Superman, Gideon's Crossing, Glory Days, Timeless, and ''The 100.

References

External links

American television directors
American television producers
Living people
American television editors
Place of birth missing (living people)
Year of birth missing (living people)